The Philippines made its Paralympic Games debut at the 1988 Summer Paralympics in Seoul and has been fielding athletes up to the 2016 Summer Paralympics in Rio de Janeiro. Its athletes has won two bronze medals; Adeline Dumapong in powerlifting (2000), and Josephine Medina in table tennis (2016). The country has never won a Paralympic gold medal.

The Philippines, being a tropical nation, has never competed in the Winter Paralympics.

History
The Philippines made their Paralympic Games debut at the 1988 Summer Paralympics in Seoul, with three men competing in athletics and one in swimming.
It returned for the 2000 Games in Sydney, with a male athlete in the javelin event and a female powerlifter, Adeline Dumapong. Dumapong won her country's first Paralympic medal when she took the bronze medal in the Up to 82.5 kg event, lifting 110 kg. In the 2004 Athens edition, the Philippines were represented by two powerlifters.

In the 2008 Beijing Paralympics, Dumapong was due to compete, but was a non-starter in her event. The country's other representatives were in Paralympic Sailing, in the Mixed Two Person SKUD18 keelboat event who likewise finished last. The much better funded Philippine Olympic athletes had likewise failed to win any medals in the 2008 Summer Olympics.

The 2012 London Paralympic Games saw 9 Filipino athletes competing in four sports. The Philippine Paralympic team was the biggest Philippine delegation since the 1988 Paralympics in South Korea. Just like the Filipino athletes who competed in the 2012 Summer Olympics, no medals were won by the 9 para athletes. However, Josephine Medina's table tennis game ranked 4th overall in Paralympic Table Tennis standings and was the best finish for the Philippines.

In the 2016 Rio de Janeiro Paralympic Games, the Philippines snared its second Paralympic medal, ending the country's 16-year medal drought. Medina bagged bronze medal at the women's single table tennis after defeating Julianne Wolf of Germany.

Starting in 2017, Paralympic athletes winning medals at the Paralympic games will be entitled to government incentives through the Philippines Sports Commission per R.A. 10699.

Sports competed
 Athletics (1988, 2000, 2012–2020)
 Powerlifting (2000, 2004–2016)
 Sailing (2008)
 Swimming (1988, 2012–2020)
 Table Tennis (2012–2016)
 Taekwondo (2020)

Medal table

Medals by Summer Games

List of medalists

See also
 Philippines at the Olympics
 Philippines at the Asian Games

Notes

References